Anabel Knoll (born 10 April 1996) is a German triathlete. She competed in the women's event at the 2020 Summer Olympics held in Tokyo, Japan. She also competed in the mixed relay event. Knoll also competes in Super League Triathlon events. Knoll finished in bronze medal position at Arena Games Triathlon Powered by Zwift Munich, the first event of the inaugural Arena Games Triathlon Esports World Championship Series.

References

External links
 

1996 births
Living people
German female triathletes
Olympic triathletes of Germany
Triathletes at the 2020 Summer Olympics
Sportspeople from Ingolstadt